The 1935 Auckland Rugby League season was its 27th. The senior championship was again won by the Richmond Rovers who had won their first ever Fox Memorial title the previous season. They were level with Mount Albert after 12 matches and the two teams played off for the championship with Richmond winning 14–9. Despite their loss this was a significant achievement by Mount Albert who were in their first ever season in the senior first grade.

Newton Rangers who were in the middle of a revival after several poor seasons won the Roope Rooster trophy for the third time in their history with a 10-8 win over Richmond. They had previously won it in 1919 and 1920. This qualified them to play against Richmond in the Stormont Shield match. They lost 26-15 to hand Richmond their second straight Stormont Shield title. Ponsonby United won the Phelan Shield for teams who had been eliminated after the first round of the Roope Rooster with an 11-8 win over Mount Albert. Marist Old Boys won the reserve grade competition (Norton Cup) after defeating Richmond Rovers in the final by 3 points to 0. They also won the Stallard Cup when they won the knockout competition which also involved some of the Senior B teams. Mount Albert won the Thistle Cup by scoring the most competition points in the second round of the Fox Memorial competition. Robert Morrissey of Mount Albert won the champion goal kicker award after he kicked 37 goals in the Fox Memorial and Roope Rooster competitions.

The reinstated Senior B competition (Sharman Cup) was won by Otahuhu with an 8 win, 1 loss record with Papakura second with 7 wins and 2 losses. Left trailing well behind was Point Chevalier, and Waiuku with a single win and 7 losses each. At the end of the season the newly formed Green Lane senior side joined these 4 sides in the Senior B knockout competition. They performed well losing narrowly to Papakura and Point Chevalier, and defeating Waiuku to finish 4th of the 5 sides. The knockout competition was won by Papakura. This competition was followed by the Walmsley Shield matches which Papakura won 6-2 over Green Lane in the final.

The representative season was marked by the clash between Auckland and Australia who were touring New Zealand for the first time in 16 years. Auckland went down in an entertaining match 8-16. There were several trial matches played as the selectors looked to find the best possible XIII's to represent both Auckland and the North Island. Auckland also went on a brief 'Southern' tour where they had wins over Wellington and Canterbury. The representative season was finished with an Auckland Province loss to Australia 18-36.

Auckland Rugby League meetings and news

Annual meeting
At the annual meeting on April 9 the report and balance sheet was presented. It was noted that despite there being rain on ten Saturdays during the 1934 season there was a “marked increase in ground and grandstand receipts”. The working account balance had improved from £762 7/9 in 1933 to £1,254 0/9 by the end of 1934 with gate and grandstand returns totalling £2,814 10/3. The league's assets were valued at £10,983 16/7 made up from Carlaw Park (£6,980 11/2), grandstand (£3,686 10/9), furniture and fittings (£101 6/2), and plant and gear (£181 13/10), which left a profit of £435 18/4. Adjustments to the players’ insurance scheme and fewer accidents saw a saving of over £70. The league gave £429 17/3 to the clubs which was slightly up on the 1933 season. The report also noted the retirement of Messrs. F. Ellis (treasurer), T. Davis (secretary, Junior Control Board), and to Mr. Vic Simpson (secretary, Referees Association). The following were elected as officers for the 1935 season: patron, Mr. J.B. Donald; vice-patron, Mr. J.F.W. Dickson; president, James Carlaw; chairman, Mr. Grey Campbell; deputy chairman, Ted Phelan; vice-presidents, Messrs R.D. Bagnall, R. Benson, J. Bellamy, O. Blackwood, J. Donald, C. Drysdale, H. Grange, R.J. Laird, W.J. Lovett, John A. Lee (M.P.), J. Montgomery, E. Morton, Joe Sayegh, C. Seagar, Bill Schramm (M.P.), R.T. Sharman, W. Wallace, H. Walmsley, G.T. Wright, R.H. Wood, G.C.Gilmore, and Webb; club delegates to the board of control, J.W. Probert, and Jim Rukutai; referees’ delegate, William Mincham. In mid April Mr. Ernest Davis, and Mr. T.G. Symonds (managing director of George Court and Sons Ltd.) were elected vice-presidents of ARL.

The 3rd annual Auckland Rugby League ball was held on October 2 at the Peter Pan Cabaret. Members of the touring Australian team were in attendance and the combined colours of the Auckland clubs were used to decorate the ballroom.

The following were elected to the ARL Board of Control: hon secretary, Mr. Ivan Culpan; hon treasurer, Mr. J.E. Knowling; New Zealand Council delegate, Mr. R. Doble; hon solicitor, Mr. H.M. Rogerson; press steward, Mr. R. Doble; hon. auditor, Mr. R.A. Spinley; hon physicians, Drs. Tracey Inglis, Pezaro, Gwynne, Holdgate, Waddell, Burrell, and Locke; hon masseur, Mr. F. Flannagan; timekeepers, Messrs. W. Liversidge and A.E. Chapman; referees appointment board, Mr. L Binns and Wilkie; emergency committee, the chairman, secretary and Mr. Rukutai; finance committee, the chairman, secretary and Messrs. Probert and William Mincham. In mid April Mr. Ernest Davis, and Mr. T.G. Symonds (managing director of George Court and Sons Ltd.) were elected vice-presidents of ARL.

State of the game
At the dinner for the Taranaki and South Auckland teams following their representative matches with Auckland and Auckland B on August 3 a dinner was held in their honour. Present was the Minister of Education, Hon. Sydney George Smith, who spoke of the importance of sport in helping New Zealand through difficult times. Later in the evening Mr. E. Stallworthy “expressed a hope that no discrimination would be made in schools in the matter of organised sport”... and “drew the Minister’s attention to the fact that sometimes teachers had seemed somewhat biased against rugby league football, and he hoped that the ruling of his predecessor that any penalty imposed on a boy for following his desires in sport, or obstruction thereto, would be a matter for serious inquiry”. The Minister responded “I may say that I have no objection to any code of football being played in the schools”. And he then went on the explain how the responsibility lay in the case of primary schools with the education board of the district, and for secondary schools with their governing boards. He said that headmasters and teachers would be unwise to go against the desires of parents and their children in regards to wanting to play any particular game.

At a social function at Masterton on July 24 Bert Cooke spoke about the league and union codes. He said that most of the rumours about large sums in connection with league were pure imagination. He went on to say that the league code was drawing thousands in Auckland where rugby drew hundreds and that there was no doubt which game the Northerners would sooner watch. Describing the game as being "faster, cleaner and a more brainy game altogether, but players required to be very fit. Nevertheless, he did not anticipate that league would make as great progress elsewhere as in Auckland".

Broadcasting of matches
At the board of control meeting on April 17 it was decided to broadcast matches from Carlaw Park through the 1ZB station.

Trainings
At their first board of control meeting on April 10 the chairman suggested that clubs try to get their own training grounds where possible so that they could train harder and develop tactics without other teams training nearby seeing them. This was difficult to do at Carlaw Park with many teams training at the same time. It was also decided that school boys would not be allowed to train after 7pm owing to the needs of other teams.

Reintroduction of the Senior B grade
At the board of control meeting on March 6 it was decided to create a Senior B Grade. There had been one for several seasons but after the senior competition was restructured in 1931 to include 6 clubs with reserve grade teams beneath them the Senior B clubs were relegated to the second Grade competition. It was recommended by the junior management secretary, Mr. W.F. Clarke that players in the Senior B grade would have the same status as Senior A players with regard to regrading. It was suggested that the Sharman Cup be donated for the Senior B championship, and the Foster Shield for the knockout competition. The third open grade would be eliminated and now effectively become the second grade (which had been superseded by the Senior B grade). The third grade would still have a weighted grade competition. It was also decided that the winner of the grade would have the right to enter the Roope Rooster competition. Otahuhu United won the competition and played a friendly match with Ponsonby United before losing to Newton Rangers in the first round of the Roope Rooster. At the April 17 board of control meeting there was considerable debate about whether the winners of the Senor B grade should be allowed to play the last placed team in the Fox Memorial competition, even if there was no consequence to the game. From 1927 to 29 promotion-relegation games were played between these teams but were ceased). It was generally decided that it would be unfair for the last placed team in the top division to have such dire consequences hanging over them. It was also noted that the winning Senior B team could compete in the Roope Rooster competition anyway. At the Junior Management Committee meeting of April 23 it was reported that there would be six teams in the senior B grade - Papatoetoe, Otahuhu, Ellerslie, Point Chevalier, Richmond, and Waiuku. Waiuku were a new club, while Richmond's entry was described as “a fresh city side”. Ultimately Papatoetoe dd not field a side meaning there were 5 teams and 1 bye each round. It was felt later in the season that Waiuku had been so ambitious in fielding a Senior B side when they were a fledging club and would have been better placed fielding their team in the second Grade.

Application by Mount Albert United for senior status
At the first meeting of the Auckland Rugby League Board of Control on February 27 the Mount Albert United club applied for senior status. Chairman G. Grey Campbell said that the constitution allowed only six senior clubs and if there was to be an alteration there would need to be a notice of motion, along with a meeting of club delegates, with the Board of Control having the final say. The Mount Albert delegates Mr J. Johnson and G.H. Shaw said that the club wished a decision to be made early as they needed to organise before the season started and that they “would field first class senior and reserve grade teams, with much district support”. At the boards first official meeting on April 10 it was decided to admit the Mount Albert United club to the senior grade which meant it would consist of 7 teams. Mr. G. Grey Campbell said that he had looked at the names of the players which Mount Albert had submitted and they were all well recognised seniors. He also stated that there was a “strict reservation that this season no transfers from any other rugby league club be allowed, the idea being that a new club should not be strengthened at the expense of the existing clubs, which should be protected”. He also went on to say that “he felt sure Mount Albert would bring life to the competition and there were great possibilities behind the move”. Mr. R Doble spoke in support of the application by Mount Albert. On the motion of Mr. Probert to admit Mount Albert it was confirmed by vote.

Rules
At the board of control meeting on May 1 after the consideration of reports it was “decided to advise senior clubs that the new play the ball and hooking rules would be more rigidly enforced from next Saturday”. Players would be given the opportunity to “brush up” on the rules by attending referee demonstrations on Tuesday and Thursday evenings. It was scheduled that all coaches and team captains would meet on April 24 at a Referees Association conference to discuss the new amendments to the playing rules. The play the ball rule stated that “players playing the ball must keep both feet on the ground until the ball has been placed thereon and the players acting as respective halfbacks must stand one yard behind the player playing the ball. All other players must not approach within three yards and be behind the acting halfbacks”. In addition to this the “offside rule of five yards radius within which players are offside is now increased to 10 yards”. While a drop out from touch now necessitated that “the attacking player must stand five yards away from the goal line, and when the game is restarted the ball must be kicked from behind the goal posts, and must reach this five yard mark. Formerly the attacking player stood on the goal line”.

At a control board meeting on May 8 there was a question from a club regarding injured players and replacements. The response was: “(1) An injured player can be replaced up to the end of the first spell; (2) an injured player is one incapable of carrying on in play; (3) a team which plays twelve players in the first half is entitled to add a player, even in the second half, because the laws of the game provide for thirteen men a side; (4) players or officials of a club are not entitled to convene meetings of players with members of another club”.

After complaints from junior grades regarding players wearing boots with illegal sprigs the referees association said that they had no right to police this. However the referees association received official advice from the control board meeting on May 20 that they did indeed have the right to inspect players boots to ensure that boots, whether "Bakelite or Aluminium were not dangerous".

On August 5 at the ARL Referees’ Association meeting Mr. W. Mincham reported that the control board had ruled that a player leaving the field sick could not be replaced, but an injured player could be. The matter had arisen after an incident in a third grade match at Victoria Park. Mr Saunders, the referee said that the "ambulance man" had told him that the player was "suffering from concussion as well as influenza" and the matter had been misreported to the control board.

Carlaw Park
In May the City Rovers club wrote a letter to the Board of Control saying that the terrace fence was dangerous. The league responded that they realised this and that work would be undertaken on the fence “as soon as funds permitted”.

Club flags were discussed at the 26 June meeting and the chairman suggested that a "flag-pole be erected near the scoreboard … to indicate by the flying of a pennant the team leading during the progress of the main game. Mr Campbell said the idea was one given him by Mr. Horrie Miller. The suggestion was adopted". Mr Miller was the secretary of New South Wales Rugby League and had recently visited New Zealand. It was decided at the July 3 ARL meeting to address the flagpole next to the score-board proposal next season as the chairman said that it was "also proposed to improve the present score-board".

Referees had money and other items stolen from their dressing rooms during matches at Carlaw Park and at the July 3 ARL meeting it was decided that the issue of unauthorised people gaining "admittance to the dressing rooms" needed to be addressed and was referred to a sub-committee for investigation.

Following the North Island v South Island match on August 17 the ARL reported that the takings for club matches at Carlaw Park were "just over £500 better than those in 1934" and that "during the past ten weeks heavy rain had fallen each Saturday, otherwise the figures would have been even more satisfactory".

Jersey Colours
After several issues in junior matches where both teams wore uniforms of a similar nature confusing players, the referee, and spectators alike the league decided to form a 'colours committee' to look into the matter. Mr. D. Wilkie said "after full deliberation … it was suggested that the Otahuhu club's jerseys be taken over and an alteration be made to Glenora jerseys. It was agreed that Ponsonby should retain their present colours. In connection with the clash of colours between City Rovers and Ellerslie, the former club had decided to differentiate by equipping their teams with white shorts". Otahuhu would be "suitably recompensed" for their forced change. The committee also thought that they should compile a register with all the details regarding colours and width of bands on jerseys and other particulars. Their recommendations were adopted and the colours committee were given authority to file patterns from jersey manufacturers in the register for reference. They then examined samples of the new Auckland representative jerseys and deferred their decision on them.

Player losses to English professional teams
In the off-season Newton Rangers lost the services of Mortimer Stephens and Cyril Blacklaws who were signed by St Helens. Stephens was from South Auckland and had originally played rugby league for Papakura. He represented Auckland and the North Island side in 1934. Blacklaws had also started his rugby league at Papakura before joining Newton. They both spent some time at St Helens before later signing for Rochdale Hornets. Later Mortimer Stephens son Owen became a representative rugby player, playing for the All Blacks, and the Wallabies, before switching to rugby league and playing for Parramatta and Wakefield Trinity in the 1970s.

Bert Cooke's retirement
At a social evening in Masterton on July 24 Bert Cooke had intimated that this season would be his last. He said that beyond the season he would "probably be wandering about in plus fours, carrying a bag of golf clubs". It was later confirmed that he had indeed retired after he made a statement at a dinner for the touring Australian players in October that he had played his last game. This finished a remarkable career where he represented the Auckland rugby side from 1923 to 1925, Hawke's Bay in 1926, and 1931–32, Wairarapa 1927-29, and Wellington in 1930. He made 44 appearances for the All Blacks including 8 tests, scoring 39 tries (4 in tests), and 123 total points. After his switch to rugby league in 1932 he played 46 matches for Richmond Rovers scoring 71 points. His league representative appearances included 11 matches for Auckland, 3 for the North Island, and 5 for New Zealand. He was regarded as one of the most outstanding players of his era.

Obituaries
James Carlaw

On May 22, 1935 James Carlaw died at his home in Mt Eden aged 81. Originally from Newcastle-on-Tyne, he was one of the founders of rugby league in Auckland where he had lived since 1863 after arriving from England on board the William Miles with the Albertland settlers. He was made the waterworks engineer for Auckland in 1900 and played a major part in the scheme to obtain a water supply from the Waitakere Ranges in the same year. He was then involved in the plan to build Waitakere Dam which was adopted by the City Council and completed in 1906. He retired in 1925 after 46 and a half years working for the City Council.

His name would also be forever etched on the sport of rugby league in Auckland. He was heavily involved in the securing of the land which was later named after him, Carlaw Park, and in its development as the headquarters of rugby league in Auckland. Carlaw was chairman of Auckland Rugby League from 1918 to 1920 and it took 3 years of negotiating by the board he led and the Auckland Hospital Board who owned the land before Carlaw Park was eventually developed and opened on June 21, 1921. Carlaw was also a founding member of Ponsonby United in 1908. He was president of New Zealand Rugby League between 1914 and 1919, and again from 1926 to 1928. In 1928 he was elected Auckland Rugby League president and served in that role until 3 years prior to his death. He was also well involved in the pioneers of the sport of bowls in Auckland and was the champion of the Auckland Club in the 1896–97 season, and president in 1911–12. He left a wife and “an adult family of a former marriage – Mr. John Carlaw, and three daughters, Mesdames A.E. Wetherilt, J.L. Foster and R.G. Sloman” along with ten grandchildren and one great grandchild. Chairman of Auckland Rugby League, Mr. G. Grey Campbell said of Carlaw “I think it will be generally conceded that few men have been able and willing to give to a sport more than Mr. James Carlaw gave to Auckland… his many activities in sport does not need recounting, because Carlaw Park will ever remain as a living monument to his foresight and accomplishment”. He was buried at Waikumete Cemetery at a largely attended funeral. As a mark of respect players and officials in all grades wore arm bands as a tribute to him on May 25 with the flag on the pavilion flown at half-mast.

A. (Sandy) Freeman
Sandy Freeman died in September. He was involved in Auckland rugby league from its early days and was an associate of James Carlaw. He was a referee for some time and later a member of the appointments board of the Auckland Referees’ Association of which he became a life member.

Senior A competitions

Fox Memorial standings
{|
|-
|

Fox Memorial results

Round 1
The first round saw Mount Albert play in their first ever Senior A grade match, a 13–8 win over City Rovers. They had 4 players playing in their first ever game of competitive league after switching codes. Des Herring dislocated his shoulder in the first half while playing for Mt Albert. Lou Brown had returned from England and turned out for City. Wilfred Brimble joined his brother Ted in the Newton side after joining from the Manukau 3rd grade intermediate side. He impressed on his senior debut with his older brother who was in his seventh season with Newton seniors.

Round 2
The match between Richmond and Mt Albert was played on Kings Birthday (Monday) as part of the silver jubilee celebrations before a crowd of 10,000.

Round 3
Quirke for Newton was sent off for striking an opponent though avoided suspension due to his previous good record.

Round 4
In the match between Newton and Devonport, R Kelsall (Newton) and John Donald (Devonport) were sent off in the second half and were each suspended for one match.

Round 5
Players in all matches wore arm bands as a mark of respect to James Carlaw, who had died that week. Newton applied for a replay after their match with Ponsonby on the grounds that the referee had altered his decision which enabled Ponsonby to win. The league however decided that the result stood.

Round 6
Jim Laird, the Marist captain received a bad eye injury requiring several stitches to close the wound in their 27–5 loss to Newton.

Round 7
Brian Connolly had to go to hospital after being injured in the Marist – Mount Albert match. Marist used an unusual scrum formation with 2 players in the front row and 3 in the second row with Jim Laird, their captain playing as a rover in the backs. This was partly due to his eye injury sustained the previous week but the tactic was being used in competitions elsewhere and was experimented with in the ARL this season. The referees held a meeting on June 10 to discuss the tactic. The chairman suggested that "although there was nothing in the rules covering the point, the Auckland League be asked to insist that the orthodox scrum formation, 3-2-1, be adhered to". However others including Mr Hill and Mr S Billman believed that experiments by clubs should be encouraged to improve scrums and hooking.

Round 8

Round 9
The Governor General, Lord Galway was a guest at the matches at Carlaw Park where the new grandstand had been opened.

Round 10
During Richmond's match Bert Cooke broke his nose in the second half. After receiving treatment from St John's he insisted on returning to the play, “and saw out the game in good style”.

Round 11
Payne (Ponsonby), and E McNeil (Richmond) were sent off in their match and suspended for one week.

Round 12
Newton and Ponsonby met in the first ever senior A match at Glen Eden. Newton won 14 to 13.

Round 13
The match between Mount Albert and Marist saw a large amount of fighting with 4 players sent off in the second half (Herring and Hassan for Mount Albert, and Carter and Flannagan for Marist). Herring and Carter were suspended for a match and Hassan and Flannagan were “severely reprimanded”.

Round 14

Final

Friendly Matches
Prior to the commencement of the Roope Rooster a unique weekend of matches took place. Ponsonby and Otahuhu took on each other on the #1 field at Carlaw Park, however at 1:30 Devonport played Marist and City played Newton. At halftime in the respective matches the leading teams continued play on the #1 field while the trailing teams played against each other on the #2 field.

Ponsonby v Otahuhu
Scoring was barely reported for any of the matches but it was noted that Roy Bright scored several tries for Ponsonby.

First Half Matches

Second Half Matches

Roope Rooster

Round 1
The match between Mount Albert and Marist was once again marred by rough play and H Shadbolt was sent off after a fight broke out at a scrum. He was suspended for the remainder of the season.

Semifinals

Final
Auckland were on tour and as a result Richmond were missing Bert Cooke, Eric Fletcher, Cliff Satherley, and Bill Telford, while Claude Dempsey and Ted Brimble were absent for Newton.

Phelan Shield

Preliminary semi-finals

Semifinals

Final

Stormont Shield
Australian actress Nellie Bramley kicked off the main game and then was carried off the field by Quirke and Stan Prentice. Flags were flown at half-mast due to the death of Mr. A (Sandy) Freeman, an old Auckland official and life member of the Auckland Referees Association.

Final

Top try scorers and point scorers
The point scoring lists are compiled from matches played in the Fox Memorial, Roope Rooster, Phelan Shield, and Stormont Shield. Competitions which involved all first grade sides

Other senior club matches

Newton v Huntly

Newton v Whangarei
Newton travelled to Whangarei to mark the opening of Jubilee Park. A large crowd was in attendance with Mayor Mr. W. Jones expressing pleasure at the league taking over “such a splendid piece of ground”.

Taupiri v Mount Albert
Mount Albert travelled to Taupiri to play their senior side. Both teams were missing many of their best players and Taupiri ran out 11-6 winners.

Whangarei v City

Wellington v Richmond

Whangarei v Devonport

Taradale v Mount Albert
Mount Albert travelled to the Hawke's Bay to play Taradale who had won the competition there. Mount Albert won the match 22-13 after a "fine exhibition for the 1.X.L. Cup". Gunning, a Mount Albert forward had to stay in Napier after breaking his collarbone.

Huntly v Richmond
On June 3 Richmond had the bye in the Fox Memorial competition so they travelled to Huntly to take on the local senior side. They ran out winners by 19 points to 0. In the evening a dance was held in their honour at the Parish Hall, Huntly with music supplied by Peden’s Orchestra. Mr W.C. Davies spoke as the local club patron with Mr Redwood, the Richmond manager replying along with Bert Cooke.

Senior reserve competitions

Norton Cup (senior reserve championship)
In Round 8 Devonport was unable to fulfil their fixture with Marist and asked for the opportunity to play it at a later date which was declined due to their being no time to do so. In Round 9 City protested their 5–5 draw with Devonport on the grounds that the referee called the game off at 3pm which meant that the second half was played short. The matter was referred to the Referee's Association for report. At the conclusion of the round robin the top 4 teams played off for the title. In the match between City and Richmond the crowd encroached on the field 3 times halting play. City's win meant that Marist would have to playoff for the title with Richmond. Marist won the title with a 3–0 win in the final.

Standings 
A number of match results were not published in any of the newspapers so complete win loss records and points for and against are not available.
{|
|-
|

Results

Stallard Cup (reserve and senior B knockout)
The decision was made for the Stallard Cup to have senior reserve teams competing with the senior B sides. In round 1 Papakura recorded a win over the Mount Albert reserves despite playing much of the second half short after Smith left the field injured and Len Taylor later left with concussion. Marist Reserves won the competition defeating City Reserves in the final 16-3 with the match played as the curtain-raiser to the first test between New Zealand and Australia.

Senior B (Sharman Cup)
Otahuhu won the Sharman Cup when they won the Senior B championship competition and were congratulated on it at the junior management committee meeting on 9 July by chairman Mr. D. Wilkie.

Standings 
{|
|-
|

Results

Senior B knockout (Walmesley Colts Shield) 
Green Lane's newly formed senior team was added to the Senior B ‘knockout’ competition which was a ‘knockout’ competition in name only. It was in fact played over 5 rounds with Papakura winning it. The New Zealand Herald stated that they won it with 51 points for and 8 against though this did not line up with the reported scores. Otahuhu were second, Point Chevalier, Green Lane and Waiuku trailing.

Standings and results 
{|
|-
|

Foster Shield
After their August 10 match Green Lane protested the result on the grounds that the referee had blown for full time early. It was later decided that the match would be replayed if it would have any bearing on the championship. After Waiuku's match with Point Chevalier their bus was involved in a collision with a car. The rear axel was broken though nobody was injured.

Other club matches and junior grades

Junior grade competitions
Nominations were received at the beginning of the season for 8 senior grade sides, 16 for the third grade (to be split into two sections), 11 fourth grade sides, 10 fifth grade sides, 8 sixth grade sides, and 4 seventh grade sides. There were weighing in committees formed at Papakura and Otahuhu while weighing in began nightly in late April at the League rooms in Courthouse Lane.

Richmond won the 2nd Grade championship (Hayward Shield), and they also won the Monteith Shield by winning the knockout competition. Ponsonby won the 3rd Grade championship (Walker Cup) and the Murray Cup for winning the knockout competition. A Britton of Ellerslie was named the most sportsmanlike player. Glenora won the 4th Grade championship, taking out the Hospital Cup, they tied with Newton in the knockout competition for the Kiwi Shield. Richmond A won the Endean Shield when they took out the 5th Grade championship and they followed it up with a win in the knockout competition to claim the Milicich Cup. Richmond won the 6th grade championship for the Rhodes Shield and completed the double by taking out the Hammill Cup awarded to the winners of the knockout competition. The Richmond club also took out the 7th Grade championship for the Myers Cup, with the same team winning the Oval Shield for the knockout competition and the Walmsley Miniature Shield for winning the special round.

Richmond again were successful in the schoolboys grade winning the Newport Shield when they took out the championship. Devonport won the Eccles Memorial Shield by finishing runners-up. Devonport also won the knockout competition with the Ernest Davis Cup awarded as the prize. Marist won the Robert Reid Memorial Shield for winning the seven-a-side competition with the runners-up being Richmond. Richmond also won the Walmsley Midget Shield, with the best uniformed team being named as Richmond who won the E. Bennett Cup.

Richmond once again won the Davis Points Shield for being the most successful junior club in Auckland. They continued their dominance of this trophy.
Grades were made of the following teams with the winning team in bold:
2nd Grade Hayward Shield: Richmond 22, Ponsonby 16, R.V. 14, Glenora 10, Mount Albert, Manukau, Papakura
3rd Grade Walker Cup: Ponsonby, Akarana A, Akarana B, City, Ellerslie, Marist A, Marist B, Manukau A, Manukau B, Devonport, Otahuhu, Northcote, Ponsonby, Richmond
4th Grade Hospital Cup: Glenora, Newton, Ponsonby, Otahuhu, Point Chevalier A, City, Richmond, Glenora, Point Chevalier B, Papakura, Northcote, Mount Albert
5th Grade Endean Shield: Richmond A 27, Ellerslie 21, Newton 17, Devonport 16, Akarana 15, Mount Albert, Papakura, Richmond B
6th Grade Rhodes Shield: Richmond, Devonport, Point Chevalier, Glenora, City, Northcote
7th Grade Myers Cup: Richmond, City, Avondale
Schoolboys Newport Shield: Richmond, Northcote, Otahuhu, Devonport, Avondale, Akarana, Avondale Convent, Ellerslie, City, Marist
Schoolboys Seven-a-side: Marist, Green Lane, Richmond A, Richmond B, Akarana, Otahuhu, Avondale, Avondale Convent

Auckland representative season
Messrs. Ernie Asher, Bert Avery, and William Mincham were re-elected as Auckland selectors for the season. Archie Ferguson, and William Liversidge had also been nominated. There had been some debate around the number and makeup of the selectors. Richmond Rovers had been in favour of just one selector along with one other club, though 5 clubs favoured 3 selectors. Newton Rangers provided a letter suggesting that “no nominee be a member of clubs or of the management committee”. Jim Rukutai said that “only the most suitable men should be considered, irrespective of club interests” with William Mincham in support.

The season began with two matches at Carlaw Park with Auckland B taking on South Auckland in the curtain-raiser and Auckland A playing Taranaki. The matches were played to assist the selectors in choosing the North Island side for their annual match with the South Island.

During the representative season it was decided to go on a southern tour. The team group of players they selected for the tour were:- Backs – Claude Dempsey (Newton), Bert Cooke (Richmond), Lou Brown (City), W Hall (Devonport), Arthur Kay (Ponsonby), Brian Riley (Ponsonby), Wilf Hassan (Mount Albert), Eric Fletcher (Richmond), and E Brimble (Newton), Forwards – Jim Laird (Marist), Lou Hutt (Ponsonby), H Simpson (Devonport), Des Herring (Mount Albert), Cliff Satherley (Richmond), Harold Tetley (Richmond), Dan Keane (Marist). The team selected was not the best available as the better players were kept in Auckland to continue training for their match against the touring Australian side. Chairman C. Grey Campbell acted as manager and Thomas McClymont as coach.

Late in the season Auckland selected a schoolboys representative team to play a Northland side. Auckland won the Golden Bloom banner by winning the match. Auckland was coached by Lou Brown who presented his English test jersey, acquired whilst playing for New Zealand to the player of the day, which was R. Bradley of the Richmond club.

Fixtures

Auckland B v South Auckland (Waikato)

Auckland A v Taranaki
Bert Cooke had been originally selected to play but injured his shoulder so was replaced in the side. Taranaki put on a good display in the first half and only trailed by a point at the break before Auckland A ran away with the match.

Inter-Island match (Courtney Silver Football Trophy)
This was the 10th inter-island match stretching back to 1925. The North Island had won 7, the South Island had won 1 in 1929, with a draw in 1930. Roy Bright, Wilf Hassan and McNeil (Richmond) were selected to play for the North Island but were unavailable. The North Island had 3 players debuting, Bill Telford, Ted Mincham, and W. Large (Hawke’s Bay).

Auckland A v Auckland B (Auckland Trial)
In the second half A.S. O’Connor of Wellington replaced Frank Halloran. This had been arranged prior to the match as the selectors wanted to look at players in view of the upcoming Australian visit. A.S. O’Connor was a former Canterbury player who had recently moved to Wellington.

Wellington v Auckland (Southern tour match)
Former All Black Herbert Lilburne had switched codes and played for Wellington.

West Coast v Auckland (Southern tour match)

Canterbury v Auckland (Southern tour match)

Auckland v Australia (Australian tour match)
Australian legend Dave Brown who was renowned for his point scoring feats and was referred to as "the Bradman of league" scored 10 of Australia's 16 points. This was the first match Australia had played in New Zealand since their 1919 tour.

Auckland Province v Australia (Australian tour match)

Auckland representative matches played and scorers

Tāmaki (Auckland Māori) representative team
The New Zealand Māori Advisory Board was granted the use of Carlaw Park on July 31 for the first Waitangi Shield challenge match of the season between Auckland Māori and Taranaki Māori. The following players were selected to practice at Carlaw Park on Wednesday the 24th of July for the match against Taranaki Māori for the Waitangi Shield: A. Nathan, P. Nathan, D. Nathan, A. Kelsall, Skelton, Steve Watene, E. Kirkwood, A. Wharepouri, D. Hapi, J. Hapi, Ratu, Hira, Lou Brown, Turei, Murray, C. Faulkner, P. Kauhoa, P. Awhitu, W. Rangi, J. Stanaway, K. Tarawhiti, and P. Tepana. The match played on July 31 ultimately turned out to be Takahiwai, representing Northland Māori in their first ever representative match. Tāmaki held on to the Waitangi Shield with a comfortable 24-8 win with New Zealand international Lou Brown scoring 2 tries. They played further matches against Hawke's Bay Māori, and Waikato Māori. They won both matches to retain the Shield.

Fixtures

(Waitangi Shield) Tāmaki v Takahiwai (Northland)

(Waitangi Shield) Tāmaki v Hawke’s Bay Māori
The Hawke’s Bay team was described as being very heavy with an average weight of 11st 10lb in the backs and 13st, 10lb in the forwards. The Hawke’s Bay forwards dominated the play, although Tāmaki’s Steve Watene was described as the best forward on the field. It was the brilliance of the Tāmaki backs which saw them win an entertaining match 27-25 with Lou Brown playing in the centres scoring 2 tries and setting up 2 others. Hapi who was a former Hawke’s Bay rugby representative also played well for Tāmaki on the wing.

(Waitangi Shield) Tāmaki v Waikato Māori
The Tāmaki team lost 2 players to injury and Steve Watene had to come on to play. With the scores tied 8-8 he scored what proved to be the match winning try in the corner. In the evening both teams were entertained at the Prince Arthur Hotel.

Tāmaki (Auckland Māori) representative matches played and scorers

Annual general meetings, club news, and senior registrations and transfers
Auckland Rugby League Junior Management Committee/Control Board held their annual meeting on March 26 with all clubs represented and Mr. D. Wilkie presiding. The annual report showed an increase in the number of teams in 1934 with “well over a thousand grade players registered”. All winning teams from the various grades were congratulated. It was also stated that the league had “definitely decided to start a senior B grade competition to meet the needs of district extension” with details to be finalised. The committee was elected as follows: Messrs. D. Wilkie, A Hopkinson, T. Chernside, I. Stonex, G. Taylor, E. Chapman, C.G. Howe, T. Carey, and G. Short. Mr. D Wilkie was re-elected chairman. It was decided that the nominations for all grade teams would close on April 23, and opening day would be Saturday, May 4. At the June 4 meeting the issue of weighing of players was discussed. Notably the “desirability of compelling players to weigh in on Saturday evening after the match instead of having until Tuesday”. The chairman and members agreed that a change was needed and would consider the proposal. On June 29 several junior teams defaulted their matches after a radio station announced that “the principal matches in the Auckland Rugby League competition will be played” which was taken to mean that junior fixtures would not take place. Chairman Mr. D. Wilkie said “that the clubs should know that the only official source of information regarding fixtures was the rugby league office and they decided to “circularise the clubs in this matter”. A special subcommittee was appointed to address the issue of junior clubs concerned with clashes in colours of playing uniforms. Messrs. W. Mincham and Jim Rukutai were placed in charge of the committee.

Auckland Rugby League Ladies Committee started their charity work early in the season. They visited Harold Walmsley who was a well-known supporter of the game. They had previously organised the second annual ball which was held during the visit of Western Suburbs the previous season and were currently planning the King's Silver Jubilee ball. At the board of control meeting on March 27 it was “resolved to approve a proposal by the A.R.L. ladies committee to hold a jubilee ball early in May in honour of His Majesty the King, supreme patron of the rugby league”. Messrs. J.W. Probert and J Rukutai were declared re-elected as representatives on the board.

Auckland Rugby League Primary School Management Committee held their annual meeting in late March. The report noted that nine teams had taken part in the championship competition in the 1934 season, with seven playing in the seven-a-aside tournament for midgets. The following officers were elected: patron, Dr. G Pezaro; president, Mr. R.E. Newport; chairman, Mr. A. Stanley; vice-presidents, same as last year, with the addition of Messrs. J Sayegh and C Brockliss; secretary, Mr. L. Rout; selector, Mr. S. Dickie. They also altered their constitution so that schoolboys should not exceed 7st 7lb, and not be more than 14 years of age at the beginning of the season. They held a carnival on June 3 at Carlaw Park with a series of matches being played. Teams competing were Otahuhu, Avondale Convent, Akarana, City, Marist, Avondale, Devonport, Ellerslie, Richmond, and Northcote. While in the seven-a-side competition the teams were Avondale Convent, Otahuhu, Green Lane, Akarana, Ellerslie, and Avondale. Mr. E. B. Bennett donated a cup for the “best-equipped school team”. The management committee decided to ask Mr. R.E. Newport, president of the primary school management, to act as the adjudicator of the trophy.

Auckland Rugby League Referees Association held their annual meeting on March 26 with Mr. Les Bull presiding. Bull stressed the need for “greater uniformity in the application of rules”. The following officers were elected: president, Mr. L. Bull; vice-president, Mr. J. G. McGowatt; hon vice-presidents same as last year; delegate to the Auckland control board, Mr. W. Mincham; delegate to New Zealand Referees’ Association, Mr. L. Bull; honorary treasurer, Mr. P. Rogers; honorary auditor, Mr. A Chapman; executive committee, the chairman, vice-president, secretary, treasurer, and Messrs. A.E. Chapman, S.A. Fisher, and M. Wetherill; appointments board, Mr. A. Rae; examination committee, Messrs. J.G. McGowatt and T. Hill; social committee, Messrs. W. Mincham, R. Otto and M. Wetherill. At the ARL annual meeting on April 9 a shield “with silver plates upon which to record the names of life members was presented to the Referees’ Association” was presented by chairman H. Walmsley with Mr. L. Bull accepting the shield on behalf of the association. It was later decided that the Walmsley Shield would be presented for life membership and suitably inscribed. At the control board meeting of April 17 Mr. Arthur Ball was added as the third member of the Appointments’ Board. At their May 13 meeting they made changes to their executive with Mr. A. Chapman taking the position of treasurer, Mr. B. Emirali to auditor, and Mr. T. Evans was added to the committee. While Messrs. A. Lennie and A. Farrell were elected new members while Mr. Freeman Thompson was nominated for membership. A donation was made by vice-president, Mr. J. Pennington, and a trophy from Mr. S Jackson. At the June 5 Board of Control meeting it was decided to make arrangements so referees and players knew which field on the Auckland Domain they were playing on so they could start on time. The listings in the newspapers typically just said that they were playing at the Domain without stating which field, which caused problems as there were several fields. At the July 3 ARL Board of Control meeting chairman Mr. G, Grey Campbell said he “was concerned about many incidents of late tackling where players were charged long after they had lost possession of the ball, and he agreed that stricter control was necessary”. Mr. W Mincham said that the Referees Association was also keen to assist in suppressing late tackling “which was a menace to the game”.

Akarana Rugby League Football Club Akarana complained at the May 21 Junior Management meeting that City Rovers had “acquired four of its third grade players for the reserve seniors without due notice, with the result that Akarana was compelled to play its team short in the grade”. Mr. Stonex said that the matter would be brought before the senior board. At the July 30 junior management meeting they notified the league that they were claiming a £1 transfer fee “in respect of Donovan, acquired by City Rovers for its reserve team”. Akarana was found to have fielded two overweight players in their 5th grade match with Ellerslie and the result was reversed with Ellerslie awarded the win.

Avondale League Football Club held a social at the Oddfellows’ Hall in Avondale in March. There was a large attendance with Mr. A. Stanley (chairman of the rugby league primary schools’ committee) presiding.

City Rovers held their annual meeting on March 24 at 10:30am. There were 100 members in attendance with Mr. W.J. Davidson presiding. It was said that the club had a healthy credit balance. It was decided that they would have an improved jersey design. The officers were elected as follows: patron, Mr. R.B. Ashby; president, Mr. J.E. Parker; club captain, Mr. B. Davidson; secretary and treasurer, Mr. E.K. Asher; auditor, Mr. E.J. Phelan; vice-presidents, same as last year with power to add; committee, Messrs. J. Sullivan, O. Miller, R. Turner, W. Syms, J.H. Gallagher, S. Dickie, W. McLean, S Watene, J Counihan, and W Drew. The City club applied for use of Carlaw Park #2 for night training during the season. The City senior A and reserve grade sides played trial matches against Marist Old Boys at Carlaw Park on April 19. City were wearing new jerseys and they clashed with the red, white and blue of Ellerslie. It was suggested that “for their juniors against Ellerslie, City should revert to their old red and black jerseys”. The junior management committee compared jerseys and at their June 18 meeting decided that “the colours of the City Rovers’ new jerseys were out of order for juniors, particularly against Ellerslie”. City protested the result of their reserve grade match with Ponsonby after the referee awarded City a try and then altered his decision and disallowed it. Ponsonby won the match 5–3, and it was decided by the ARL Board to ask the Referees’ Association for a “report on the matter”. City was granted permission on July 3 to play a match at Whangarei a week later. Ernie Asher was appointed their manager for the trip.

Devonport United applied for a match to be held on the North Shore and this was agreed by the league. The match was to involve Devonport and Mt Albert senor teams. Devonport were granted permission to play a match at Whangarei on July 20. They held their annual dance at the Masonic Hall in Devonport on August 21. The tables were decorated in steamers of the club colours, black and white.

Ellerslie United League Football Club held their annual meeting on March 22 with Mr. J. McInnarney presiding. During it Mr. J Ryan was elected a life member. The following were elected officers: patron, Mr. W.J. Jordan, M.P.; president, Mr.J. McInnarney; vice-presidents, Messrs R. McIsaac, M.J. Barn, J. Walters, C. Clarke, S. Pemberton; club captain, Mr. F. Chapman; hon auditors Messrs O.D. Slye and J. Carr; hon secretary and treasurer, Mr. G. Whaley; executive committee, Messrs O.D. Slye (chairman), J Pinches, G. Skeen, G. Chapman, A Appleton, J Beere, R. Hunter, T. Emery, A. Tobin, and C. Edgar. Ellerslie protested a fifth grade match with Akarana, believing two of the Akarana players to be over weight. This was confirmed and Ellerslie was awarded the match.

Glenora Rugby League Football Club held their annual meeting at the R.S.A. rooms in Glen Eden before a large attendance. Mr. Wilfred McNeil presiding, with Messrs. A. Hopkinson, George Taylor, and I. Stonex representing the junior management. The annual report showed a “considerable increase in support for the club in the district last season, and expressed confidence for the future”. The following officers were elected; patron, Mr. A.J. Routley; vice-patrons, Messrs. Frank Newton, sen., Chas. Robertson; president, Mr. George Bond; chairman, Mr. J. Elshaw; treasurer, Mr. S. Pearson; secretary, Mr. M.E. McNamara. A request came in from the Glen Eden district for a senior match to be played there during the season. There were complaints regarding the similarity of club colours between Glenora and Otahuhu. It was ruled that “teams must only play in registered club colours” with the Otahuhu club agreeing to “utilise white facings when opposed to Glenora”. Glen Eden had requested a senior match be played there and on the 13th of July the Ponsonby v Newton match was played there making it the first ever senior match of rugby league played in Glen Eden.

Green Lane Rugby League Club were formed in early June with junior management committee member Mr. D. Wilkie presiding. He reported that “the prospects were good for a very strong district unit in the game. They nominated three teams in the third, fourth and sixth grades which were all accepted at the junior management meeting on May 28, and were also looking to form a senior B grade team as well. At the Board of Control meeting on June 5 Mr. D. Wilkie reported that in addition to the three new junior teams, they had also formed 2 new school thirteens, and a seven-a-side team which all led the start of the club. In late June Green Lane had their club colours of emerald green, black, and white approved.

Manukau Rugby League Club held their annual meeting at Kelvin Hall in Onehunga on March 18 at 8pm. The Manukau club asked for an early senor fixture at Onehunga and this was approved by the league. A suitable date with an alternative was submitted by the club at the May 8 Board of Control meeting. The entire Manukau A 3rd grade team was suspended on June 25 after misconduct on two successive Saturdays. In June the Onehunga Sports Federation thanked the ARL “board for a donation of £10 towards the development of its grounds scheme in the Manukau district”. G. Carroll of the Manukau A third grade side occurred in late June and was held over pending the result of a Manukau Club transfer. At the July 16 junior management meeting the Manukau 3rd grade team had their disqualification uplifted with the exception of 3 players. The club was also notified that “the team coach was not deemed a suitable person t have charge of a team.

Marist Brothers Old Boys League Football Club held their annual meeting at the Auckland Rugby League rooms in Grey’s Buildings on March 20, at 7:45pm. The president Mr. J. Sayegh spoke about the season prior and “pleasure was expressed at the restoration to health of Mr. C. Gregory, the senior coach, who had met with a serious accident during the recess”. The club had a credit balance of £170. Officers elected were: patron, Rev. Dr. Liston, Bishop of Auckland; president, Mr. J. Sayegh; treasurer, Mr. E. J. Foster; club captain, Mr. H. Brisbane; delegate junior management, Mr. M. Thompson; auditors, Messrs. P. Fletcher and H Donovan; executive, Messrs. J. Ball, D. Mulavey, J Chalmers, W. Glover, G Batchelor, F Webberley and J Flynn. The Marist Old Boys senior A and reserve grade sides played trial matches against City Rovers at Carlaw Park on April 19.
Mangere Rugby League Football Club The Mangere senior B grade players were regraded to second grade, subject to their names being supplied. This decision was made at the junior management meeting on August 6.

Mount Albert United Rugby League Football Club prior to the commencement of the season applied to the Auckland Rugby League to be admitted into the senior grade competition. They held their annual meeting at King George Hall, Mount Albert Terminus on March 18 at 8pm. Mt Albert submitted a request at the 19 June ARL Board of Control meeting from the Taradale senior team from Hawke's Bay who wished to play a match in Auckland. Mt Albert offered to accommodate the visitors during their time in Auckland and to entertain them. On July 10 Mt Albert was advised that they would be unable to play Taradale at Carlaw Park due to the upcoming visit of the Australian team. It was reported that Mt Albert hoped to play Taradale in Hawke's Bay later in the season. Mt Albert was granted permission for its senior team to play at Taupiri on July 6 with Mr. J. Johnson to manage the team. The July 3 ARL meeting discussed the issue of securing permanent dressing room accommodation for the Mt Albert club at Carlaw Park, with the matter being left in the hands of Chairman Campbell. At the August 7 Board of Control meeting Mr. J. Johnson as part of a Mt Albert deputation asked if the players from their senior side selected to play in the A and B trial as curtain-raiser to the inter-island match could be released from the fixture to travel with Mt Albert to play Taradale in Hawke's Bay. Chairman Campbell said that it wouldn't be possible as the trial match was to assist the selectors in selecting the New Zealand team to play against Australia. Mr Johnson said that their trip to Hawke's Bay would likely now have to be called off. Mt Albert did eventually decide to travel to Hawkes Bay to play the Taradale club side and advised the league that their secretary Mr. W. G. Shaw would manage the team's visit.

Newton Rangers Football Club held their annual meeting at the Y.M.C.A on March 13 at 7:30pm. Mr. E.W. Cloke was noted as being actively involved in the Newton club as secretary by the Auckland Rugby League at their March 27 Board of Control meeting. On May 16 Newton held a meeting at the Y.M.C.A with George Steven presiding in the absence of Mr. Roy Baddeley who was unwell. The Rangers extended its social committee to form a supporters club with Mr. Steven appointed chairman, and Mrs. G. Matthews secretary. A membership card in the club colours was issued with details of the supporters club policy to be laid down at a general meeting later. On 19 June Newton travelled to Whangarei with their manager Mr. J. Rutledge to play a match against the local side.

Northcote and Birkenhead Ramblers League Football Club In early July the Northcote club informed the junior management committee that during their drawn third grade game with Richmond the “linesman put up his flag but later informed the referee that a try was scored”. The matted was then referred to the Referees’ Association. At the junior management meeting on July 16 “Northcote Ramblers” applied for a senior fixture to be played at their ‘home ground’ at Stafford Park. The request was referred to the senior board. On August 1, Northcote held a dance at the Kings Theatre in Northcote to celebrate their twenty-fifth anniversary. The club colours of black and gold, “adorned the supper tables”.

Otahuhu Rugby League Football Club stated at their annual meeting that the balance-sheet revealed a “healthy position” with “bright prospects for the coming season”. They presented caps to C. Kelly and F. Philp who were chosen as the “most conscientious players” for 1934. The following members were elected as follows: patron, Mr. W.W. Massey, M.P; president, Mr. J. Nicholson; vice-presidents, Dr. Eric Roy Lange (David Lange’s father), Messrs. T. Clements, D. Jones, W. Lockhart, A. Whye, A. Brown, C. Nicolson, W. Allen, Bennett, Conn and W. Bright; chairman, Mr. R. Brennan; hon secretary, Mr. W. Arnold; hon treasurer, Mr. W. Bright. The Otahuhu club wrote to the ARL in mid May that their secretary Mr. L.W. Arnold had resigned, and Mr. M. Ritchie had been appointed. On June 1 the Otahuhu Borough Council “gave assurance that in the allocation of grounds there to sport bodies, rugby league would be given proper consideration. Otahuhu nominated itself for the Roope Rooster knockout competition at the July 10 ARL Board meeting after they had won the Senior B competition.

Papakura Rugby League Football Club Former Papakura players Mortimer Stephens and Cyril Blacklaws (who had both transferred to Newton Rangers) were signed by St Helens. Their annual meeting was held on March 19 with Mr. S.H. Godden presiding over an attendance of 45 members. They noted that they had entered 5 teams in 1934 with about 70 players in 1933, increasing to 100 in 1934. Their balance sheet showed a credit of about £9. The Artcheson Medal for the most improved player from the fourth grade team of 1934 was awarded to R. Aukett. The following officers were elected; patron, Mr. E.C. Foote; president, Mr. S.H. Godden; vice-presidents, Messrs, Les McVeigh, C.C. Chamberlain, C.N. Spencer, H.A. Pollock, and B Lanigan; club captain, Mr Wm. Cornthwaite; treasurer, Mr Ron Walsh; social committee, Messrs, E. Ashby, I.R. Wilson, W. Elliott, J.H. McInnes, H. Hawley, and Ray Richardson; grounds committee, Messrs A. Hill, W. Martin, A McVeigh, and C. Whelan; hon doctors, Dr. G.W. Lock, and Dr. H. Burrell; auditor, Mr. I.R. Wilson. The first scheduled practice was scheduled for March 30. The club membership fee was fixed at 5s with 2s of this being paid to the Auckland Rugby League. At the Papakura Town Board meeting on March 26 they received a letter from the Papakura Club asking for permission to play on Prince Edward Park this season. The rent amount “was referred to the finance committee to investigate, together with a proposal to charge 1/ admission on four days during the season. On April 8 at the town board meeting it was decided to fix the ground rental at £5. The town board was also to build a fence on the western side of the playing area “in order to keep back spectators”. The club claimed a transfer fee from the move of Roy Johnstone to the Newton seniors the previous season and the junior management committee approved the claim at their May 28 meeting. Papakura planned a trip to Whangarei at the end of the season with most of the funds required contributed by their supporters. Ivan Wilson, who had been playing for Mt Albert, was fare-welled at a function at Papakura where he had been a club player for 5 years. He was moving to Wellington due to a work transfer. Papakura held their annual concert on October 10 with about 70 club members in attendance.

Point Chevalier League Football Club At the July 31 board of control meeting Point Chevalier sent a deputation consisting of Messrs. Irwin (James) Hing (chairman and coach - who had previously played for Marist, Ponsonby and later Richmond), and J. Blackler, committee member. They asked for a senior match to be played in the district in connection with the queen carnival they were holding to help raise money for the building of a training shed and clubhouse for the Point Chevalier club. It was reported that the plans were already being well received. Chairman Campbell “urged the club to make an effort to obtain a well-lighted ground rather than confine training to a shed”. It was decided by the board to look on their request “favourably” and do what it could to help the club and district. They held their ‘benefit’ ball at the Dixieland in Point Chevalier on August 26. The function was conducted in the form of an ‘old-time’ dance and was under the auspices of the Holtonian dance management. Nine hundred people attended and “danced to the music of Holt’s popular orchestra”.

Ponsonby United Football Club held their annual meeting at Leys Institute on March 11 at 7:30pm. During the meeting they produced their 25th annual report in which they noted that they had done well winning 7 games with a “young and clever first thirteen”. Mr Longbottom had been the selector and Frank Delgrosso the coach. Mention was made of the passing during the off-season of former player Arthur Carlaw, who had died in November, 1934. Mr. E. C. McEwan was also thanked for his decoration of the club's room at Carlaw Park. He was also the appointed electrician at Carlaw Park and was heavily involved in the installation of the electric lights there the previous season. The following officers were elected: patron, Mr A.H. McKeown; president, Mr. H. Philburn; hon. secretary, Mr. E.C. McEwan; committee, Messrs, A. McIntyre, N.D. Culpan, B Anderson, N. Bass, and A. Lane; auditors, Messrs Ivan Culpan and A.F. Knowling; club captain, Victor Fagan; vice-presidents were re-elected. Lou Hutt was appointed player-coach of the senior team replacing Frank Delgrosso. It was reported later in March that N. Bass and W. Murray (selector) were unable to accept office, and Messrs. C. Raynes, C. Brown and W.J. Hindman had been elected to the club committee. Ponsonby applied for use of Carlaw Park #2 for night training during the season. The club later informed the league that its president, Mr. S. McDonald was transferred to Wellington and Mr. C.J.W. Taylor had been elected president. In June the Ponsonby club advised the ARL that Mr. D. Lane had succeeded Mr. A.S. McIntyre as their reserve grade coach. They also said that when the senior colour change was approved that it would also apply to the junior teams as well. The ARL asked the club to make special provisions. In early July the Ponsonby club informed the junior management committee that it had appointed Mr. J.C. Lumsden as their junior delegate with Mr. D. Lane the vice-delegate. At the July 3 ARL meeting Ponsonby complained that the “lighting facilities at Victoria Park were inadequate for training purposes and were dangerous. It was suggested that two additional floodlights on the pavilion and one immediately opposite on the other side of the ground, were necessary”. The board decided to approach the City Council regarding the issue. On August 17 Ponsonby 3rd grade  defeated Taranaki Juniors 25 to 5 in New Plymouth.

Richmond Rovers Football Club At a ARL Board of Control meeting on March 6 the Richmond club recommended that a sole Auckland selector be appointed for the season (as opposed to the usual 3). Richmond were granted permission by Auckland Rugby League to travel to Huntly on June 8 to play there. At the July 2 junior management meeting the decision by the senior board to make Richmond pay H. Divers transfer fee (after they acquired him in 1934) was supported. In July Richmond arranged a trip to Wellington for its bye round to play a match in the newly resurrected Wellington rugby league. The team to tour was: Bert Cooke (captain), E. McNeil, E.T. Mincham, A. Mitchell, J. Young, E Fletcher, N. Bickerton, R. Powell, H Tetley, Cliff Satherley, Ray Lawless, A. Broadhead, J Satherley, W. Telford, C. Verrall (two to be omitted). Richmond was awarded the E.B. Bennett Cup for the best-dressed team, with Green Lane second and Marist third.

Tamaki Maori Rugby League Club advised the Board of Control at their May 22 meeting that the following had been elected officers for the season: hon. secretary and treasurer, Mr. W. N. Panapa; chairman, Mr. Stan Rickards; committee, Messrs. J. Wilson (senior), Ernie Asher, N. Reweti, W. Parora, G. Matthews, T. Kirkwood, H. Ngapera, K. Wera, J. Wilson (junior), and J. Pae; selectors, Messrs. Asher, Wera, and J. Wilson (senior).

Waiuku Rugby League Club entered a team in the newly created Senior B competition. In July 1934 they had held a meeting and decided to form a sub-league in Waiuku and to affiliate with the Auckland league. The following committee was elected: Messrs L, Neuth. A. Healey, D. Coe, P. Tong, B. Flavell, H. Murray, and L. Wassell (secretary). At that time they had hoped to secure the services of a coach from Auckland. They received several donations of trophies, including a cup from Mr. S.C. Sycamore. In mid May, 1935 they advised the Junior Management meeting that it had the use of Massey Park, and the charge of the domain board for the ground was sent to the control board for approval. At the junior management meeting on June 18 Waiuku had their nomination for a fifth grade team accepted for the knock-out competition. Their club secretary Mr. W. Gordon said “that much interest was being taken in the code in the district”.

Senior grade registrations and transfers
Wilf Hassan transferred from Marist Old Boys to Mt Albert United on May 1 after his suspension had been uplifted, as did P. Walder. J.J. Magee and J. Miller transferred from Glenora to City Rovers, Lyle Rogers from Glenora to Ponsonby United, H. Lunn moved from Ponsonby United to Newton Rangers, P. Young from Richmond Rovers to Newton Rangers, J. Molehouse transferred from Pt Chevalier to Newton Rangers, Tony Milicich from Richmond Rovers to Devonport United, C. Thomas Ponsonby United to Pt Chevalier subject to a regrade, while the same applied to H Neale who was transferring from Ponsonby United to Papakura. Len Barchard was cleared for transfer from Devonport to Marist on April 25. The following players at the same meeting were registered as senior players: Carl Spiro, Richard Seddon Shadbolt, and Robert Esmond Morrissey (Mt Albert), F. Hulme (Newton), and D.A. McGee (Devonport). On May 1 the following senior players were registered: George William Surtees (Parnell), Roy Nightingale, D Stewart, and A. Matthews (Mt Albert), Lou Brown, D Hira, Pat Nathan, and Tai Nathan (City), E Smith and A Dufty (Newton), and J.C. Cowan (Devonport). 

J. Speight, C. Watt, Charles Albert McNeil, and S.J. Bennett had their reinstatement approved at the May 8 Board of Control meeting. At the same meeting there were several registrations; E. Brown, N. McCarthy and J.F. Taylor (Ponsonby); C Tryon and L.J. Scott (Devonport); F. Blyth and L. Martinovich (Mt Albert); and L.R. Davis (Richmond). At the Board of Control meeting on May 15 Bert Leatherbarrow was granted a transfer from Devonport to Ponsonby (he was residing in Waitoa at the time but returning to Auckland). The following players were registered; Ross Nathan (City to Newton), W.S. Cooke (Mt Eden to City), Ronald J. Couper (Herne Bay to Richmond), and E. Gallagher (Mt Eden to Mt Albert). 

On May 22 the following players were reinstated: L.J. Edkins, L.J. Smith, P. Kennedy, J. Speight, and Bert Leatherbarrow's transfer from Devonport to Ponsonby being made official. The following players were registered: J.E. Everett (Devonport), S.F. Thorpe (Ellerslie to Devonport), and B.D. Connolly (Grey Lynn to Marist). At the May 29 meeting the following players were registered: H.V. Hogg (Taranaki to Ponsonby), George A. Kerr (North Auckland to Newton), J.C. Martin (Mt Eden to Newton), G.W. Ratcliffe (Mt Eden to Richmond), and Phil D. Martin (City to Mt Albert). On June 5 the following senior players were registered or transferred: E.W. Coyle and W. Murray (Ponsonby), Sydney Hookway (Pt Chevalier), Victor Norris and Ernest Tier (Devonport), James A. Dye (City), and Don Cleverley (Mt Albert). On June 12 A. Bright of Newton was cleared for transfer to Pt Chevalier. The following players were registered: A. Wicks (Mt Eden), J Leonard (City to Devonport), A.A. Marinovich (Oratia to Devonport), O. McAdam (Mt Eden to Mt Albert). 

On June 19 Harold M. Hill was registered with the Ponsonby club after moving from South Auckland (Waikato). R.S. Simpson registered with Mt Albert, while Tim Peckham was registered with City. On June 26 H.W. Collins and W.F. Ford were registered for City Rovers, C. Pierce with Devonport, and P Awhitu to Newton. 

On July 10 R. McGreal transferred from Marist to Ngaruawahia, while City Rovers reported having registered J.T. Hapi, the ex-Hawke's Bay rugby union representative wing three quarter. 

On July 17 C. Stephens (Akarana) transferred to Devonport, as did O. Donaldson of City. G. Ellis of Mt Albert transferred to Newton, while J. Pirihi also transferred to Newton. H.T. Irvine was reinstated from Marist rugby club to Mt Albert, at the July 24 ARL meeting, While W.M. Charlesworth of Paeroa was registered with Mt Albert. 

On July 31 W. Carroll, an ex-South Auckland rugby union representative was registered with the Marist Old Boys. On August 7 Leo Cooney, an ex-North Auckland rugby union rep and All Black triallist was registered with the City Rovers. On August 14 John Tawhai, formerly of Auckland Grammar School was registered with the City Rovers. Reginald Dick and R Grant were registered with the Newton club, B.W. Johnston was registered with Ponsonby, and J.C. Burgess with the Marist club on August 28.

References

External links
 Auckland Rugby League Official Site

Auckland Rugby League seasons